Daraa Governorate is one of the fourteen governorates (provinces) of Syria. It is situated in the south-west of the country and covers an area of 3,730 km2. It is bordered by Jordan to the south, Quneitra Governorate and Israel to the west, Rif Dimashq Governorate to the north and As-Suwayda Governorate to the east. The governorate has a population of 998,000 (2010 census office estimate). The capital is the city of Daraa.

Several clashes have occurred within the governorate throughout the Syrian civil war.

Districts 

The governorate is divided into three districts (manatiq). The districts are further divided into 17 sub-districts (nawahi):

 Daraa District (8 sub-districts)
 Daraa Subdistrict
 Bosra Subdistrict
 Khirbet Ghazaleh Subdistrict
 Al-Shajara Subdistrict
 Da'el Subdistrict
 Muzayrib Subdistrict
 Al-Jiza Subdistrict
 Al-Musayfirah Subdistrict

 Izra District (6 sub-districts)
 Izra Subdistrict
 Jasim Subdistrict
 Al-Hirak Subdistrict
 Nawa Subdistrict
 Al-Shaykh Maskin Subdistrict
 Tasil Subdistrict
 Al-Sanamayn District (3 sub-districts)
 Al-Sanamayn Subdistrict
 Al-Masmiyah Subdistrict
 Ghabaghib Subdistrict

See also 
 Druze in Syria
 Daraa Governorate campaign

References

External links
 Official Site of Daraa Governorate (Arabic)
edaraa The First Complete website for daraa news and services

 
Governorates of Syria